Mechanism is the belief that natural wholes (principally living things) are similar to complicated machines or artifacts, composed of parts lacking any intrinsic relationship to each other.

The doctrine of mechanism in philosophy comes in two different flavors. They are both doctrines of metaphysics, but they are different in scope and ambitions: the first is a global doctrine about nature; the second is a local doctrine about humans and their minds, which is hotly contested. For clarity, we might distinguish these two doctrines as universal mechanism and anthropic mechanism.

Universal mechanism 

The older doctrine, here called universal mechanism, is the ancient philosophies closely linked with materialism and reductionism, especially that of the atomists and to a large extent, stoic physics. They held that the universe is reducible to completely mechanical principles—that is, the motion and collision of matter. Later mechanists believed the achievements of the scientific revolution had shown that all phenomena could eventually be explained in terms of 'mechanical' laws, natural laws governing the motion and collision of matter that implied a thorough going determinism: if all phenomena could be explained entirely through the motion of matter under the laws of classical physics, then even more surely than the gears of a clock determine that it must strike 2:00 an hour after striking 1:00, all phenomena must be completely determined: whether past, present or future.

The French mechanist and determinist Pierre Simon de Laplace formulated the sweeping implications of this thesis by saying:

One of the first and most famous expositions of universal mechanism is found in the opening passages of Leviathan by Thomas Hobbes (1651). What is less frequently appreciated is that René Descartes was a staunch mechanist, though today, in the philosophy of mind, he is remembered for introducing the mind–body problem in terms of dualism and physicalism.

Descartes was a substance dualist, and argued that reality was composed of two radically different types of substance: extended matter, on the one hand, and immaterial mind, on the other. Descartes argued that one cannot explain the conscious mind in terms of the spatial dynamics of mechanistic bits of matter cannoning off each other. Nevertheless, his understanding of biology was thoroughly mechanistic in nature:

His scientific work was based on the traditional mechanistic understanding that animals and humans are completely mechanistic automata. Descartes' dualism was motivated by the seeming impossibility that mechanical dynamics could yield mental experiences.

Isaac Newton ushered in a much weaker acceptation of mechanism that tolerated the antithetical, and as yet inexplicable, action at a distance of gravity. However, his work seemed to successfully predict the motion of both celestial and terrestrial bodies according to that principle, and the generation of philosophers who were inspired by Newton's example carried the mechanist banner nonetheless. Chief among them were French philosophers such as Julien Offray de La Mettrie and Denis Diderot (see also: French materialism).

Anthropic mechanism 

The thesis in anthropic mechanism is not that everything can be completely explained in mechanical terms (although some anthropic mechanists may also believe that), but rather that everything about human beings can be completely explained in mechanical terms, as surely as can everything about clocks or the internal combustion engine.

One of the chief obstacles that all mechanistic theories have faced is providing a mechanistic explanation of the human mind; Descartes, for one, endorsed dualism in spite of endorsing a completely mechanistic conception of the material world because he argued that mechanism and the notion of a mind be logically incompatible. Hobbes, on the other hand, conceived of the mind and the will as purely mechanistic, completely explicable in terms of the effects of perception and the pursuit of desire, which in turn he held to be completely explicable in terms of the materialistic operations of the nervous system. Following Hobbes, other mechanists argued for a thoroughly mechanistic explanation of the mind, with one of the most influential and controversial expositions of the doctrine being offered by Julien Offray de La Mettrie in his Man a Machine (1748).

The main points of debate between anthropic mechanists and anti-mechanists are mainly occupied with two topics: the mind—consciousness, in particular—and free will. Anti-mechanists argue that anthropic mechanism be incompatible with our commonsense intuitions: in philosophy of mind they argue that if matter is devoid of mental properties, then the phenomenon of consciousness cannot be explained by mechanistic principles acting on matter. In metaphysics anti-mechanists argue that anthropic mechanism implies determinism about human action, which is incompatible with our experience of free will. Contemporary philosophers who have argued for this position include Norman Malcolm and David Chalmers.

Anthropic mechanists typically respond in one of two ways. In the first, they agree with anti-mechanists that mechanism conflicts with some of our commonsense intuitions, but go on to argue that our commonsense intuitions are simply mistaken and need to be revised. Down this path lies eliminative materialism in philosophy of mind, and hard determinism on the question of free will. This option is accepted by the eliminative materialist philosopher Paul Churchland. Some have questioned how eliminative materialism is compatible with the freedom of will apparently required for anyone (including its adherents) to make truth claims. The second option, common amongst philosophers who adopt anthropic mechanism, is to argue that the arguments given for incompatibility are specious: whatever it is we mean by "consciousness" and "free will," be fully compatible with a mechanistic understanding of the human mind and will. As a result, they tend to argue for one or another non-eliminativist physicalist theories of mind, and for compatibilism on the question of free will. Contemporary philosophers who have argued for this sort of account include J. J. C. Smart and Daniel Dennett.

Gödelian arguments
Some scholars have debated over what, if anything, Gödel's incompleteness theorems imply about anthropic mechanism. Much of the debate centers on whether the human mind is equivalent to a Turing machine, or by the Church-Turing thesis, any finite machine at all. If it is, and if the machine is consistent, then Gödel's incompleteness theorems would apply to it.

Gödelian arguments claim that a system of human mathematicians (or some idealization of human mathematicians) is both consistent and powerful enough to recognize its own consistency. Since this is impossible for a Turing machine, the Gödelian concludes that human reasoning must be non-mechanical.

However, the modern consensus in the scientific and mathematical community is that actual human reasoning is inconsistent; that any consistent "idealized version" H of human reasoning would logically be forced to adopt a healthy but counter-intuitive open-minded skepticism about the consistency of H (otherwise H is provably inconsistent); and that Gödel's theorems do not lead to any valid argument against mechanism. This consensus that Gödelian anti-mechanist arguments are doomed to failure is laid out strongly in Artificial Intelligence: "any attempt to utilize [Gödel's incompleteness results] to attack the computationalist thesis is bound to be illegitimate, since these results are quite consistent with the computationalist thesis."

History
One of the earliest attempts to use incompleteness to reason about human intelligence was by Gödel himself in his 1951 Gibbs Lecture entitled "Some basic theorems on the foundations of mathematics and their philosophical implications".  In this lecture, Gödel uses the incompleteness theorem to arrive at the following disjunction: (a) the human mind is not a consistent finite machine, or (b) there exist Diophantine equations for which it cannot decide whether solutions exist. Gödel finds (b) implausible, and thus seems to have believed the human mind was not equivalent to a finite machine, i.e., its power exceeded that of any finite machine. He recognized that this was only a conjecture, since one could never disprove (b). Yet he considered the disjunctive conclusion to be a "certain fact".

In subsequent years, more direct anti-mechanist lines of reasoning were apparently floating around the intellectual atmosphere. In 1960, Hilary Putnam published a paper entitled "Minds and Machines," in which he points out the flaws of a typical anti-mechanist argument.  Informally, this is the argument that the (alleged) difference between "what can be mechanically proven" and "what can be seen to be true by humans" shows that human intelligence is not mechanical in nature. Or, as Putnam puts it:

Let T be a Turing machine which "represents" me in the sense that T can prove just the mathematical statements I prove. Then using Gödel's technique I can discover a proposition that T cannot prove, and moreover I can prove this proposition. This refutes the assumption that T "represents" me, hence I am not a Turing machine.

Hilary Putnam objects that this argument ignores the issue of consistency. Gödel's technique can only be applied to consistent systems. It is conceivable, argues Putnam, that the human mind is inconsistent. If one is to use Gödel's technique to prove the proposition that T cannot prove, one must first prove (the mathematical statement representing) the consistency of T, a daunting and perhaps impossible task. Later Putnam suggested that while Gödel's theorems cannot be applied to humans, since they make mistakes and are therefore inconsistent, it may be applied to the human faculty of science or mathematics in general. If we are to believe that it is consistent, then either we cannot prove its consistency, or it cannot be represented by a Turing machine.

J. R. Lucas in Minds, Machines and Gödel (1961), and later in his book The Freedom of the Will (1970), lays out an anti-mechanist argument closely following the one described by Putnam, including reasons for why the human mind can be considered consistent.  Lucas admits that, by Gödel's second theorem, a human mind cannot formally prove its own consistency, and even says (perhaps facetiously) that women and politicians are inconsistent. Nevertheless, he sets out arguments for why a male non-politician can be considered consistent. These arguments are philosophical in nature and are the subject of much debate; Lucas provides references to responses on his own website.

Another work was done by Judson Webb in his 1968 paper "Metamathematics and the Philosophy of Mind".  Webb claims that previous attempts have glossed over whether one truly can see that the Gödelian statement p pertaining to oneself, is true. Using a different formulation of Gödel's theorems, namely, that of Raymond Smullyan and Emil Post, Webb shows one can derive convincing arguments for oneself of both the truth and falsity of p. He furthermore argues that all arguments about the philosophical implications of Gödel's theorems are really arguments about whether the Church-Turing thesis is true.

Later, Roger Penrose entered the fray, providing somewhat novel anti-mechanist arguments in his books, The Emperor's New Mind (1989) [ENM] and Shadows of the Mind (1994) [SM]. These books have proved highly controversial.  Martin Davis responded to ENM in his paper "Is Mathematical Insight Algorithmic?" (ps), where he argues that Penrose ignores the issue of consistency.  Solomon Feferman gives a critical examination of SM in his paper "Penrose's Gödelian argument." The response of the scientific community to Penrose's arguments has been negative, with one group of scholars calling Penrose's repeated attempts to form a persuasive Gödelian argument "a kind of intellectual shell game, in which a precisely defined notion to which a mathematical result applies ... is switched for a vaguer notion".

A Gödel-based anti-mechanism argument can be found in Douglas Hofstadter's book Gödel, Escher, Bach: An Eternal Golden Braid, though Hofstadter is widely viewed as a known skeptic of such arguments:

Looked at this way, Gödel's proof suggests – though by no means does it prove! – that there could be some high-level way of viewing the mind/brain, involving concepts which do not appear on lower levels, and that this level might have explanatory power that does not exist – not even in principle – on lower levels. It would mean that some facts could be explained on the high level quite easily, but not on  lower levels at all. No matter how long and cumbersome a low-level statement were made, it would not explain the phenomena in question.
It is analogous to the fact that, if you make derivation after derivation in Peano arithmetic, no matter how long and cumbersome you make them, you will never come up with one for G – despite the fact that on a higher level, you can see that the Gödel sentence is true.

What might such high-level concepts be? It has been proposed for eons, by various holistically or "soulistically" inclined scientists and humanists that consciousness is a phenomenon that escapes explanation in terms of brain components; so here is a candidate at least. There is also the ever-puzzling notion of free will. So perhaps these qualities could be "emergent" in the sense of requiring explanations which cannot be furnished by the physiology alone.

See also 

Automaton
Causality
Digital physics
Mechanical philosophy
Neural Darwinism in relation to anthropic mechanism
Philosophy of physics
Teleomechanism
Mechanism (biology)

References

External links
 An overview of attempts to define "life"
 

 "The Problem of Mechanism" by David L. Schindler (from Beyond Mechanism) – contrasts the Aristotelian and Cartesian views of nature and how the latter engendered the mechanical philosophy

Cognitive science
Determinism
Materialism
Metaphysical theories
Natural philosophy
Naturalism (philosophy)
Philosophical analogies
Theory of mind